Yetunde Ayeni-Babaeko (born 1978) is a Nigerian photographer.

Life
Yetunde Ayeni-Babaeko was born in Enugu, Eastern Region, Nigeria in 1978. Her father was Nigerian and her mother was German. She moved to Germany as a child, attending secondary school there and completing a photography apprenticeship at Studio Be in Greven. In 2005 she returned to Nigeria. In 2007 she opened her own studio, Camera Studios, based in Ikeja.

Ayeni-Babaeko's 2014 exhibition 'Eko Moves', in collaboration with the Society for Performing Arts of Nigeria (SPAN), portrayed dancers in public spaces in Lagos. Her 2019 exhibition 'White Ebony' highlighted the situation of people with albinism.

References

External links
 Personal website of Yetunde Ayene Babeko
 Camera Studios

1978 births
Living people
Nigerian photographers
Nigerian women photographers